The 1956 Tour de Hongrie was the 17th edition of the Tour de Hongrie cycle race and was held from 29 July to 5 August 1956. The race started and finished in Budapest. The race was won by Győző Török.

Route

General classification

References

1956
Tour de Hongrie
Tour de Hongrie